Tolstoi is a hamlet in the Municipality of Emerson – Franklin, Manitoba, Canada.

History 
Tolstoi was founded by Ukrainian immigrants in the 1890s, one of the earliest Ukrainian settlements in western Canada.  Once a thriving community, Tolstoi's population has declined dramatically in recent decades. Its current population is generally older, as most young people have left for jobs in Winnipeg.

The community is served by a grocery store, Ukrainian Catholic and Ukrainian Orthodox churches. The Tolstoi Hotel and Bar closed in 2008.  The community is also the home to the Tolstoi Seniors Centre which is located in the former two-room school house.  The hamlet also has a Ukrainian National community hall which is rented out for social events.

Tolstoi is the transfer point for microwave (S-band) television signals between Winnipeg and North Dakota. The closest weather station is at Emerson.

Between 1974 and March 1986, cable companies in Winnipeg received the NBC and CBS affiliates from Fargo, KTHI TV11 and KXJB-TV TV4, respectively (via translator K58BP at Glasston, North Dakota). Two other signals, ABC and PBS affiliates from Grand Forks, WDAZ TV8 and KGFE TV2, are also received from here. By March 1986 Videon Cablesystems and Greater Winnipeg Cablevision received permission from the Canadian Radio-television and Telecommunications Commission (CRTC) to replace KTHI and KXJB-TV with WDIV and WJBK of Detroit, Michigan via the CANCOM package on the Anik satellite. WDAZ and KGFE are still available on Winnipeg cable TV.

One of the biggest challenges for the hamlet is reliable cellular telephone services.   The hamlet is located between cellular tower services areas  and service is spotty and requires residents to purchase and install antenna and boosters for their residences.

References

Hamlets in Manitoba
Unincorporated communities in Eastman Region, Manitoba
Ukrainian-Canadian communities in Manitoba